The Gwalia Gold Mine is located at Gwalia, a few kilometres south of Leonora, Western Australia. It was originally established by Welsh miners in the late 19th century and Herbert Hoover, the later President of the United States, served as the mine manager in its early days from May to November 1898.

It is operated by St Barbara Limited. From its discovery to 2019, the mine produced  of gold, at a 2019 equivalent value of A$10 billion.

History

It was established in 1896 as the Sons of Gwalia mine. Gwalia is a medieval Latin name for Wales which became popular in Welsh-language poetry in the nineteenth century.

The Sons of Gwalia reef was discovered by three prospectors who worked it for a brief time. After selling out to George Hall for £5,000 the latter recouped his investment after only one month. In search for additional capital, Hall began negotiations with a London firm, Bewick Moreing, who sent Herbert Hoover, a 23-year-old mining engineer, to the site. Hoover recommended Bewick Moreing purchase the mine, which they did with a cash commitment of £100,000 on 17 November 1897. He suggested himself as manager of the project and successfully reduced costs at the mine by hiring Italian labour.

A fierce rivalry between Gwalia and neighbouring Leonora developed and a tram service was established between the two towns in 1903. From the 1920s, the town started to decline when external factors like the falling gold price started to affect the mine. On 21 December 1963, the gold mine at Gwalia closed and the town was reduced in population from 1,500 to 40. The Sons of Gwalia mining company was delisted for the first time on 4 February 1964. In 65 years of operation, the mine had produced  of gold.

In the 1980s, a new Sons of Gwalia company, formed by the brothers Peter and Chris Lalor, descendants of Peter Lalor, started retreating old tailings before mining the old workings. In 1999, having concluded mining the Gwalia open pit, it started to develop an underground operation, passing through old workings by 2001.

On 4 September 2000, a flight to the Gwalia mine with seven Sons of Gwalia employees failed to land, instead continuing on to Burketown, where it eventually crashed, having run out of fuel. The pilot and the planes seven passengers were killed.

From 2001 onwards, the mine was part of the company's Leonora operations, after it acquired the Tarmoola Gold Mine through a merger with Pacmin Mining.

In December 2003, the mine was placed in care and maintenance after known gold resources were exhausted.

After a rapid rise of the company, unauthorised gold and foreign exchange trading activities by chief financial officer Eardley Ross-Adjie in the year to June 2000, ended up costing Sons of Gwalia more than A$190 million. Sons of Gwalia went into administration on 30 August 2004, following a financial collapse, with debts exceeding $800 million after suffering from falling gold reserves and hedging losses. Sons of Gwalia was Australia's third-largest gold producer and also controlled more than half the world's production of tantalum.

Apart from Gwalia, St Barbara also formerly operated the Marvel Loch Gold Mine at Marvel Loch and Tarmoola Gold Mine. All three mines were previously owned by the now defunct mining company Sons of Gwalia Limited. Sons of Gwalia went into administration on 30 August 2004 and the company's gold mining operations were sold to St Barbara in March 2005 for A$38 million, having been valued by the Sons of Gwalia directors at A$120 million. While Marvel Loch was operational before and after the sale, the Gwalia mine was already placed in care and maintenance at the time of the transaction. A fourth mine, the Carosue Dam Gold Mine, ceased operation in June 2005. All three have since been sold by St Barbara.

St Barbara purchased the mine from insolvent Sons of Gwalia in March 2005 with a three-year plan to reopen it.

After a three-year redevelopment, production resumed at the mine in September 2008, with the first gold pour being carried out in October 2008.

The Gwalia Gold Mine has continued underground production since reopening in 2008.

Production
Production of the mine:

Notes

 2002 results for January to September only. Additionally to this, the Kundana and East Kundana undergorund operations were added to the Mungari Operation in 2021.
 Combined result for the Leonora operations, consisting of Gwalia and Tarmoola. The Gwalia mine however closed in December 2003.
 Only the Gwalia mine, excludes King of the Hills extension.

References

Bibliography

External links 

 
 MINEDEX website: Gwalia - Leonora Database of the Department of Mines, Industry Regulation and Safety
 How sons of Lalor built, then sank, Sons of Gwalia The Sydney Morning Herald - Article on the collapse of Sons of Gwalia

Gold mines in Western Australia
Surface mines in Australia
Underground mines in Australia
Shire of Leonora